Justin Young (born March 9, 1993) is a Vietnamese- American professional basketball player for the Thang Long Warriors of the Vietnam Basketball Association (VBA).

Pro career

Hochiminh City Wings (2016)
In 2016, Young joined the Hochiminh City Wings of the VBA prior to the league's inaugural season. At the conclusion of the season, he was named the Defensive Player of the Year, finishing with averages of 10.38 points, 10.52 rebounds, and 2 assists per game.

Hanoi Buffaloes (2017)

Thang Long Warriors (2017–present)
Prior to the start of the 2017 season, Young decided not to re-sign with the Ho Chi Minh City Wings. Instead, he took his chances elsewhere in the 2017 VBA draft.  On 14 June, he was selected by the Thang Long Warriors with the number one overall pick in the 2017 draft.

International career
In 2018, Young received a Vietnamese passport, making him eligible for international play with the Vietnamese national team.

Career statistics

VBA

|-
| style="text-align:left;"| 2016
| style="text-align:left;"| Hochiminh City Wings
| 21 || 17 || 33.7 || .390 || .110 || .410 || 10.5 || 2 || 1.9 || 1.4 || 10.4
|- class"sortbottom"
| style="text-align:left;"| 2017
| style="text-align:left;"| Thang Long Warriors
| 20 || 20 || 36.4 || .390 || .240 || .540 || 8 || 4.2 || 2 || .5 || 12.3
|- class"sortbottom"
| style="text-align:left;"| 2018
| style="text-align:left;"| Thang Long Warriors
| 17 || 16 || 36.3 || .420 || .110 || .440 || 9.9 || 3.1 || 3.1 || .3 || 14.1
|- class"sortbottom"
| style="text-align:center;" colspan="2"| Career
| 58 || 53 || 35.5 || .400 || .153 || .463 || 9.5 || 3.1 || 2.3 || .7 || 12.3

Awards and honors

VBA
Defensive Player of the Year: 2016

References

External links

1993 births
Living people
American expatriate basketball people in Vietnam
American men's basketball players
American sportspeople of Vietnamese descent
Competitors at the 2019 Southeast Asian Games
Saigon Heat players
Small forwards
Southeast Asian Games bronze medalists for Vietnam
Southeast Asian Games medalists in basketball
Vietnamese basketball players
Southeast Asian Games medalists in 3x3 basketball
Competitors at the 2021 Southeast Asian Games
Southeast Asian Games silver medalists for Vietnam